The Balfour Beatty London Youth Games Hall of Fame was created in 2009 to recognise former London Youth Games competitors who have gone on to world class sporting careers and to celebrate the role the Games have had in their development.

Since its launch, eighteen athletes have been inducted at the annual Hall of Fame and Awards Evening, which also recognises the groups and individuals who make a huge contribution to the success of each year.

To date, the London Youth Games Hall of Fame inductees have won 28 Olympic or Paralympic medals and 57 World Championship medals, and amassed over 1000 international appearances for their country. The Hall of Fame athletes cover ten sports and thirteen London boroughs.

2009
The first group were inducted into the Hall of Fame on Tuesday 15 September 2009. These included former Olympic 100m champion Linford Christie, former Olympic 400m champion Christine Ohuruogu, former javelin world record holder Steve Backley, Chicago Bulls NBA All-Star Luol Deng, Olympic Lightweight Double Sculls rowing gold medallist Mark Hunter and Paralympic swimmer Dervis Konuralp.

2010
The second Hall of Fame evening took place on Thursday 9 September 2010 at Lord's Cricket Ground. That year's inductees included Olympic 400m hurdler medallist Tasha Danvers, double Olympic champion Mo Farah, five-time Premier League champion and England footballer Rio Ferdinand, world bronze medallist netball player Amanda Newton, six-time Paralympic gold medallist and six-time London Marathon winner David Weir and Tour De France winner and four-time Olympic cycling gold medallist Bradley Wiggins.

2011
The 2011 Hall of Fame and Awards Evening took place on Tuesday 20 September at Lord's Cricket Ground. The third batch of inductees consisted of three-time Olympian skier Chemmy Alcott, Paralympic swimming gold medallist Elaine Barrett, world triathlon champion Tim Don, Commonwealth Games gold medallist high jumper Dalton Grant, Commonwealth Games gold medallist squash player Paul Johnson, and superstar Arsenal and England footballer Rachel Yankey.

2012
The 2012 London Youth Games Hall of Fame and Awards Evening took place on Tuesday 9 October at Lord's Cricket Ground. There were six new entries into the Hall of Fame. This included four medal winners from the London 2012 Olympics and Paralympics. Olympic cycling gold medallist Joanna Rowsell, Paralympic mixed rowing gold medallist Naomi Riches, judo star and silver medallist Gemma Gibbons and men's C2 canoeing silver medallist Richard Hounslow. England rugby star Margaret Alphonsi and double world champion sprinter John Regis completed the line-up.

Inductees

References 

All-sports halls of fame
Sport in London
England sport-related lists
Halls of fame in England
2009 establishments in England